La Jana is a municipality in the comarca of Baix Maestrat in the Valencian Community, Spain. The Cervera Mountains rise just east of the town extending southwards.

It is an agricultural town located west of the Muntanyes de Cervera surrounded by cultivated plots, mainly almond, carob and olive trees, as well as some cereal fields. La Jana is part of the Taula del Sénia free association of municipalities.

References

External links 

  Pàgina web del poble de la Jana
 Paco González Ramírez - País Valencià, poble a poble, comarca a comarca
 Institut Valencià d'Estadística
 Portal de la Direcció General d'Administració Local de la Generalitat
 

Municipalities in the Province of Castellón
Baix Maestrat